Countess Charlotte Brabantina of Nassau (Antwerp, 17 September 1580 – Château-Renard, August 1631) was the fifth daughter of William the Silent and his third spouse, Charlotte of Bourbon.  She lived in her life at the French royal court and performed many successful assignments as a mediator.

Life
She and her sisters lost their mother in 1582 and their father in 1584 and were taken care of by their stepmother Louise de Coligny, with whom they had a very good relationship.

In 1594 Louise introduced the elder sisters Elisabeth and Charlotte Brabantina at the court of Henry IV of France in order to find French Huguenot spouses for them. Elisabeth married the Duke of Bouillon in 1596 and Charlotte Brabantina married Claude de La Trémoille in 1598. She was described as a beauty and called La Belle Brabantine. She was widowed in 1604.

Charlotte Brabantina divided her life between the Thours castle, the French royal court and the Dutch court in The Hague, and was well liked by Henry IV, Marie de' Medici and Louis XIII.  Being well liked by most and with good connections, she was often given assignments as a mediator.  She acted as a mediator during the conflict between the Duke of Bouillon and Henry IV.   She also acted as a mediator in the negotiations resulting in the Treaty of Loudun in 1616. Louis XIII appointed her to chair the synd between the French reformed churches in Vitry in May–June 1617.

She maintained a correspondence with her stepmother and her sisters, who were also often politically active, and they often referred to themselves as 'femmes d'état' or female "statesmen".

Ancestry

References

 Charlotte Brabantina: biography on Worldroots

House of Orange-Nassau
House of La Trémoille
Countesses of Nassau
1580 births
1631 deaths
Princesses of Taranto
Daughters of monarchs